The 1945 Hamilton by-election was a by-election held during the 27th New Zealand Parliament in the Waikato electorate of Hamilton. The by-election occurred following the death of MP Frank Findlay and was won by Hilda Ross, both of the National Party.

Background
Findlay, who was first elected to represent Hamilton in 1943, died on 31 March 1945. This triggered the Hamilton by-election, which was contested by four candidates.

Hilda Ross contested the election for the National Party. She had served as a member of the Hospital Board and Council in Hamilton for several years and was at the time of the election the Deputy-Mayor. Former Hamilton MP Charles Barrell was selected as the Labour Party's nominee. He had been MP for Hamilton between 1935 and 1943, before losing his seat to Findlay. Leader of the Democratic Labour Party (DLP), John A. Lee was his party's candidate. The fourth person to put their name forward was independent candidate Douglas Seymour.

The by-election was held soon after VE Day (which Walter Nash decided should be celebrated on 9 not 8 May), and a "badly-timed" gazette notice calling up more 18-year-olds for unspecified military service. The National Party proposed that New Zealand troops should be withdrawn from Italy and New Zealand's role in the Pacific restricted to food supply. The Australian High Commissioner Thomas d'Alton was not the only one to see the irony that Labour wanted to keep New Zealand troops overseas (to have a say in the peace) while National wanted to withdraw them. The government candidate lost by an increased margin.

Previous election

 
 
 

 
 

 

Table footnotes:

Results
The following table gives the election results:

Ross won the election, and would win every subsequent general election until 1959, when she died in office. Her death caused the 1959 Hamilton by-election.

See also
List of New Zealand by-elections

Notes

References

1945 elections in New Zealand
Hamil
Politics of Hamilton, New Zealand
May 1945 events in New Zealand